Robinsonella brevituba is a species of flowering plant in the family Malvaceae. It is found only in Mexico.

References

Malveae
Endemic flora of Mexico
Vulnerable plants
Taxonomy articles created by Polbot